The three deaf-community sign languages indigenous to Vietnam are found in Ho Chi Minh City, Hanoi, and Haiphong. The HCMC and Hanoi languages especially have been influenced by the French Sign Language (LSQ) once taught in schools, and have absorbed a large amount of FSL vocabulary. 

The Vietnamese languages are part of a sign language area that includes indigenous sign languages of Laos and Thailand, though it is not known if they are genealogically related to each other. The influence of FSL may have obscured the links: the highest cognacy is with Haiphong Sign, which has been the least influenced by FSL. 

There are attempts to develop a national standard language, Vietnamese Sign Language.

See also
 Haiphong Sign Language
 Old Chiangmai–Bangkok Sign Language family
 Vietnamese Braille

References

 Woodward, James (2000). Sign languages and sign language families in Thailand and Viet Nam, in Emmorey, Karen, and Harlan Lane, eds., The signs of language revisited : an anthology to honor Ursula Bellugi and Edward Klima. Mahwah, N.J.: Lawrence Erlbaum, p. 23-47
 Woodward, James; Thi Hoa, Nguyen; Tran Thuy Tien, Nguyen (2004). Providing higher educational opportunities in Deaf adults in Viet Nam through Vietnamese sign languages: 2000-2003. In: Deaf Worlds 20: 3 (2004) - pp. 232–263

External links
 Students are dextrous with sign language 

Languages of Vietnam
Sign languages